Black River is a  river in the U.S. state of Michigan, flowing mostly northward through four Northern Michigan counties:  Otsego, Montmorency, Presque Isle, and Cheboygan. The main branch of the Black River rises in Charlton Township in east-central Otsego County near the boundary with Montmorency County. The East Branch of the Black River rises less than a mile to the east in Vienna Township in Montmorency County. The other major tributaries, Canada Creek, Tomahawk Creek and the Rainy River all rise in northern Montmorency County.

Tributaries (from the mouth):
 (left) Beechnut Creek
 (left) Myers Creek
  (right) Wixon Creek
 (left) Spring Creek
 (left) Section Seven Creek
 (left) Owens Creek
 (right) Twin Lakes Outlet
 Twin Lakes
 (right) Long Lake Creek
 Long Lake
 Black Lake
 Cains Creek
 Doriva Beach Creek
 Rainy River
 (left) Cold Creek
 (right) Little Rainy River
 (left) East Branch Rainy River
 Rainy Lake
 West Branch Upper Rainy River
 Rainy River Flooding formed by the Rainy River dam
 Lower Tomahawk Lake
 Upper Tomahawk Lake
 Stony Creek (also known as Strong Creek)
 Stewart Creek
 Fisher Creek
 Upper Black River (portion above Black Lake)
 (right) Milligan Creek
 (right) Stony Creek
 Stony Creek Flooding
 Adair Creek
 (right) Gokee Creek
 (right) Weed Creek
 (right) Lewis Branch Adair Creek
 Dorsey Lake (also known as Duby Lake)
 (right) Welch Creek
 (right) Gillis Creek
 (left) Bowen Creek
 (right) Sturgis Creek
 (right) Lyons Creek
 (right) Gregg Creek
 (left) Tomahawk Creek
 Francis Lake
 Little Tomahawk Lake
 Tomahawk Creek Flooding (on the boundary between Presque Isle and Montmorency counties)
 Twin Tomahawk Lakes
 (left) Canada Creek
 (right) Oxbow Creek
 (left) Bear Den Lake
 (left) Horsehead Lake
 Wildfowl Lake (also known as Upper Horsehead Lake)
 (right) Little Joe Lake (also known as Horseshoe Lake)
  (left) Lake Geneva (also known as Scotty Lake)
 Virginia Lake (also known as Perch Lake)
 (right) Montague Creek
 (right) Van Hetton Creek
 East Town Corner Lake
 West Town Corner Lake
 Muskellunge Lake
 (left) Pug Lakes
 Valentine Lake
 Jackson Lake
 Packer Creek
 (right) McMasters Creek
 (left) Little McMasters Creek
(left) West McMasters Creek
 (right) Dog Lake
 (left) East Branch Black River (rises in the Green Swamp of northwest Montmorency County)
 Foch Lakes
 Town Line Lakes
 (left) Rattlesnake Creek
 (right) Stewart Creek
 Stewart Lake (also known as Sally Lake)
 (right) Hardwood Creek
 (left) Hodge Creek
 (right) Tubbs Creek
 (right) Saunders Creek
 Mud Creek
  (right) Little Mud Creek

References 

Rivers of Michigan
Rivers of Cheboygan County, Michigan
Rivers of Presque Isle County, Michigan
Rivers of Otsego County, Michigan
Rivers of Montmorency County, Michigan
Tributaries of Lake Huron